Saleh Bakri (born 1977) is an Israeli-born Palestinian film and theater actor. He began his career in the theater. He is the son of actor and film director Mohammad Bakri, brother of actors Ziad and Adam Bakri.

Theater and film career
Bakri performed in Death and the Maiden directed by Juliano Mer-Khamis.

In 2007, Bakri appeared in his first two films: The Band's Visit, and Salt of this Sea by Annemarie Jacir, which premiered at Cannes in 2008. Salt of this Sea was Bakri's debut performance in an Arab film and went on to be Palestine's official submission for the Academy Awards.  The Band's Visit also won numerous prizes and awards. The following year he portrayed Elia Suleiman's father Fouad in The Time That Remains.

In 2011, Bakri appeared in Radu Mihaileanu's movie The Source alongside Leïla Bekhti, Hafsia Herzi, Biyouna, Sabrina Ouazani, and Hiam Abbass.

Bakri was the protagonist of Sharif Waked's work To be continued in 2009, portraying a Palestinian martyr who reads what was supposed to be the text that testifies to his approaching obliteration but emerges instead as tales from A Thousand and One Nights. Other projects include Laila's Birthday by Rachid Masharawi, playing a supporting role next to his father, Annemarie Jacir's second movie When I Saw You,  and a short movie titled Fireworks directed by Italian director Giacomo Abbruzzese. He played the eponymous protagonist in the Italian thriller Salvo, which won the Critics' Week Grand Prize at the 2013 Cannes Film Festival. In 2015 Bakri appeared at the Royal Court Theatre in the play 'Fireworks' by Palestinian playwright Dalia Taha, about two families living under siege in Gaza. In 2019 Bakri starred in Dialogue with the Unseen by Italian artist Valerio Rocco Orlando, a video installation about individuals who are questioning their own relationship with nature and society.

In 2021 Bakri's film The Present was nominated for the Academy Award for Best Live Action Short Film.

Selected filmography

References

External links

1977 births
People from Bi'ina
Living people
Beit Zvi School for the Performing Arts alumni
Arab citizens of Israel
21st-century Israeli male actors
Palestinian male actors
Palestinian male film actors